"Nobody Else" is an R&B–hip hop soul song written and recorded by American singer-songwriter Anthony Hamilton for his debut album, XTC (1996). Released as the album's first and only single, the song was produced by George R. "Golden Fingers" Pearson and Timothy "Tyme" Riley. After being released in various formats in September 1996, the single entered the Billboard Hot R&B/Hip-Hop Songs at number ninety-one the week of October 26, 1996, spending sixteen weeks on the chart and peaking at number sixty-three.

Track listing
American 12" promo single
Side A:
"Nobody Else" (LP Version) – 3:21
"Nobody Else" (Instrumental Version) – 3:21

Side B:
"I Will Go" (LP Version) – 3:47
"Nobody Else" (A cappella version) – 3:17

Charts

Anthony Hamilton (musician) songs
1996 debut singles
Hip hop soul songs
1996 songs
Songs written by Anthony Hamilton (musician)